"Ding" (German for thing) is a song released in 2006 by German reggae/dancehall band Seeed. It was the third and last single of the third album Next! and reached No. 5 in the German Single Charts.

Charts

Weekly charts

Year-end charts

References

2006 singles
2005 songs
Warner Records singles
Songs written by Peter Fox (musician)